The ancient Kingdom of Macedonia had a navy which was first assembled by Phillip II (who reigned from 359–336 BC) and which continued to expand under the Antigonid dynasty.
 The modern era North Macedonia, although not operating a military navy, has the Macedonian Lake Patrol Police as a waterborne border police force since 1991.